Henry George Liddell (1787 — 9 March 1872) was an English priest of Church of England.

Liddell was born at Ravensworth Castle, the son of Sir Henry Liddell, 5th Baronet. He studied at Brasenose College, Oxford, was ordained in 1811 and was appointed rector of Redmarshall that year. He was subsequently rector of Boldon in 1814, Romaldkirk in 1824, Whickham in 1829 and Easington in 1832.

On 11 November 1809, he married Charlotte Lyon, a daughter of Thomas Lyon and granddaughter of Thomas Lyon, 8th Earl of Strathmore and Kinghorne. They had six children, two of whom also became priests in the Church of England.

Henry George (1811-1898), priest
Thomas John (1812-1842)
Charles (1813-1894), railway engineer
Charlotte Maria Elizabeth (1815-1896)
Amelia Frances (1818-1898)
William Wren (1824-1892), priest

Liddell died at Charlton Kings, Oxfordshire on 9 March 1872, aged 85.

External links
Clergy of the Church of England database
Profile at thepeerage.com

1787 births
1872 deaths
19th-century English Anglican priests
Alumni of Brasenose College, Oxford
People from County Durham (before 1974)
Younger sons of baronets
Liddell family